Khalil Hawi (Arabic: خليل حاوي; Transliterated Khalīl Ḥāwī) (1919-1982) was one of the most famous Lebanese poets of the 20th century. In 1982, upon the Israeli invasion of Beirut in the midst of the Lebanese Civil War, Hawi committed suicide with a rifle in his apartment near the American University of Beirut. He was outraged by Lebanon's inability to stand up to the Israeli army when the latter invaded on 3 June 1982, and he deeply resented the other Arab governments' silence about the Israeli invasion of Lebanon in what was dubbed Operation Peace of Galilee, led by former Israeli Prime Minister Ariel Sharon.

In his lifetime he wrote five anthologies of poetry and regularly contributed to literary magazines such as Majallat Shiʿr ("Poetry Magazine").

List of Works 
Khalil Hawi wrote five anthologies of poetry.
River of Ash (1957)
Flute and Wind (1961)
Threshing Floor's of Hunger (1965)
Wounded Thunder (1979)
From Hell's Comedy (1979)

1919 births
1982 deaths
Lebanese male poets
Suicides by firearm
20th-century Lebanese poets
20th-century male writers
1982 suicides
Suicides in Lebanon